Dortan is a commune in the Ain department in eastern France. Besides the village of Dortan itself, the commune includes the hamlets of Uffel, Vouais, Bonaz, Emondeau, Sénissiat and Maissiat. The population was 1,845 in 2014.

History
This area was settled in the first century AD by the Sequani, a Gallic people. It was on a route used by the Romans and by the seventh century, the Abbaye de Saint-Claude had been established nearby and the area was evangelized. During the feudal period in the ninth century, the counts were Lambert and Geoffroy de Dortenc, and twenty generations of these seignieres followed. The Château de Dortan was built in the fifteenth century as a replacement for the original twelfth century building. It was attacked on many occasions, including by Cardinal Richelieu in 1637. The last of the de Dortenc lineage was Jean-François de Dortenc, who died in 1708. He had committed various misdeeds and his successor sold the château to Pierre Gaulthier, adviser and secretary of Louis XIV. Today the château is in private ownership and is included in the list of Monument historiques.

1944 massacre

In July 1944, during World War II, the Germans looted and burned the village in reprisal for activities by the French Maquis. Seven people were shot on 12 July, including the village priest and a woman. The following day, three villagers were killed and women were raped. On 20 and 21 July, 15 men were arrested and tortured at the château, which was occupied by the German troops. The next day, the remaining inhabitants were rounded up and gathered in the château while the houses in the village were burnt down. In total, 35 civilians were killed, the village was razed and only the château was left standing.

Geography
Dortan is in the extreme north of the department of Ain in central eastern France, in the district of Nantua close to the Swiss border. The commune includes the hamlets of Uffel, Vouais, Bonaz, Emondeau, Sénissiat and Maissiat, and scattered farms. The D436 road connects the village to Saint-Claude.

Population

See also
Communes of the Ain department

References

Communes of Ain
Ain communes articles needing translation from French Wikipedia